Geoffrey James (born August 26, 1953) is an American author, journalist, and contributing editor on Inc.com. His CNN blog "Sales Source" was ranked on Business.com's list of the "Top 10 Blogs on Sales Management for 2016."

Biography 
Born in 1953, James received a B.A. in English Language and Literature from University of California, Irvine in 1975. He has worked as a software architect, marketing executive, and freelance writer. He has taught courses at Boston University, University of California, Los Angeles, University of California, Santa Cruz, and University of Washington.

Works

References

External links
 The Insider System 
 Sales Source

1953 births
Living people
American male journalists
University of California, Irvine alumni